Przemysław Bereszyński (born 11 January 1969) is a Polish former professional football player and current coach. His son Bartosz is also a professional footballer.

Starting with his hometown club Lech, he won 3 championship titles in 1990, 1992 and 1993 and 2 Supercups in 1990 and 1992. 

Receiving his UEFA A Licence, he coached the Lech Poznań youth teams, and was the manager of the Warta Poznań reserve team; currently he coaches their youth.

References

1969 births
Living people
Footballers from Poznań
Polish footballers
Association football defenders
Dyskobolia Grodzisk Wielkopolski players
Lech Poznań players
Ekstraklasa players